The Olive River is a river located in the Cape York Peninsula of Far North Queensland, Australia.

The headwaters of the river rise in the Richardson Range, part of the Great Dividing Range, on the Cape York Peninsula. The river descends  over its  course.

The traditional owners of the area are the Wuthahti and Kuuku Ya’u peoples, who maintain strong spiritual connections with their country.

The riparian vegetation are home to many species only found on Cape York Peninsula including the threatened cycad plant, Cycas silvestris.

See also

References

Rivers of Far North Queensland
Bodies of water of the Coral Sea